Ruth Barbara Charteris KC (born 1973) is a Scottish advocate who has served as Solicitor General for Scotland since 2021.

Education 
Charteris studied at the University of Glasgow School of Law, where she gained an LL.B (Hons) and a diploma in legal practice.

Legal career
Charteris was admitted as an advocate in 2000 and came to the Bar on completion of her post as Legal Assistant to the Lord President of the Court of Session. Charteris served as an ad hoc Advocate Depute from 2010 to 2016. She served as a Standing Junior to the Scottish Government from 2012 and Second Standing Junior to the Scottish Government from 2016 to 2020. After her appointment as Queen's Counsel, she served as a full-time Advocate Depute from 2020 until her appointment as Solicitor General.

Charteris has been a legally qualified chair of the Scottish Social Services Council since 2017. She has been Chair of the Fitness to Practice Panel of the SSSC since 2017.

Solicitor General

Appointment 
On 16 June 2021 the Scottish Government announced that Nicola Sturgeon had recommended Charteris to the Scottish Parliament for appointment as Solicitor General for Scotland by The Queen. Her nomination as Solicitor General for Scotland was approved by the Scottish Parliament on 17 June 2021.

References

Members of the Faculty of Advocates
Scottish King's Counsel
Living people
Alumni of the University of Glasgow
1973 births
Lawyers from Glasgow
20th-century women lawyers
21st-century women lawyers
20th-century Scottish women
20th-century Scottish lawyers
21st-century Scottish women
21st-century Scottish lawyers
Scottish women lawyers